Nyzy is an urban-type settlement in Sumy Raion of Sumy Oblast in Ukraine. Nyzy belongs to Sad rural hromada, one of the hromadas of Ukraine. Population:

Economy

Transportation
Nyzy railway station is a terminus of the railway line from Boromlia, however, it does not have much passenger traffic.

The settlement has access to Highway H07 which runs north to Sumy and west to Romny, and Kyiv.

References

Urban-type settlements in Sumy Raion